The Kennedy Building is a high-rise historic commercial building located in Downtown Omaha, Nebraska, which was built in 1910.  It was listed on the National Register of Historic Places in 1985.

It was deemed notable "as a unique local adaptation of the Commercial Style, as an example of the early twentieth century tripartite method of multi-story design inspired by Louis Sullivan, and as a work of the prominent Omaha architectural firm of Fisher and Lawrie."

References

National Register of Historic Places in Omaha, Nebraska
Commercial buildings on the National Register of Historic Places in Nebraska
1910 establishments in Nebraska
Commercial buildings completed in 1910